The Total Package Tour was a co-headlining concert tour featuring American bands New Kids on the Block, Boyz II Men and American singer Paula Abdul. It began on May 12, 2017. in Columbus, Ohio and concluded on July 16, 2017, in Hollywood, Florida This was the second joint tour between New Kids on the Block and Boyz II Men (after The Package Tour four years prior), and Abdul's first tour in twenty-five years.

Background
In November 2016, New Kids on the Block, Boyz II Men, and Abdul appeared on the Today Show to announce that they would be going on tour together in summer 2017.

Setlists

Tour dates

References

2017 concert tours
New Kids on the Block concert tours
Co-headlining concert tours
Boyz II Men
Paula Abdul concert tours